Giant animal may refer to:

Megafauna, the largest animal species
Megafauna (mythology), large animals in mythology
Gigantism in animals

See also
Largest organisms
Largest prehistoric organisms